Minuccio Minucci (1551–1604) was an Italian Roman Catholic priest who was the archbishop of Zadar.

Born in Serravalle on 17 January 1551, Minuccio studied canon law in Padua. He served as secretary to the papal nuncio to Innsbruck, Salzburg and Munich in 1573, and in 1582 attended the Diet of Augsburg as secretary to the prince-bishop of Trent, cardinal Ludovico Madruzzo.

Minucci was named archbishop of Zadar (at the time a territory of the Republic of Venice, now in Croatia) on 7 February 1596 and was consecrated on 10 March.

He died on 7 March 1604 during a visit to Munich, and was buried in St. Michael's Church, Munich.

Amongst other things, he is known as he author of a History of the Uskoks.

References

External links and additional sources
 (for Chronology of Bishops) 
 (for Chronology of Bishops) 

1551 births
1604 deaths
People from Vittorio Veneto
Italian Roman Catholic archbishops
Burials at St. Michael's Church, Munich